Dobarce is a village in the municipality of Želino, North Macedonia.

Demographics
As of the 2021 census, Dobrace had 1,295 residents with the following ethnic composition:
Albanians 1,209
Persons for whom data are taken from administrative sources 86

According to the 2002 census, the village had a total of 1,695 inhabitants. Ethnic groups in the village include:
Albanians 1,692
Macedonians 1
Others 2

References

External links

Villages in Želino Municipality
Albanian communities in North Macedonia